Steven L. Nock (March 11, 1950 – January 20, 2008) was a researcher, author, and the Commonwealth Professor of Sociology at the University of Virginia. He was a recognized expert on the role of marriage in society, and worked in the Federal Department of Health and Human Services as a consultant on American family policy.

Biography 
Nock was born in 1950, the youngest of four children to Frank Nock and Edna Hinson Nock. Steven graduated from the University of Richmond in 1972 and received his Ph.D. in Sociology from the University of Massachusetts Amherst in 1976. He taught at Tulane University and was a member of the National Academy of Sciences prior to coming to the University of Virginia Department of Sociology in 1978, where he taught until his death from complications related to Diabetes mellitus.

Career 
Nock wrote extensively on the role of marriage in society. He authored text-books and articles about the causes and consequences of change in the American family. He investigated issues of privacy, unmarried fatherhood, cohabitation, commitment, divorce, and marriage. His book, "Marriage in Men's Lives" won the William J. Good Book Award from the American Sociological Association for the most outstanding contribution to family scholarship in 1999. He concluded that "all of the articles reviewed contained at least one fatal flaw of design or execution; and not a single one of the studies was conducted according to general accepted standards of scientific research", but his assertions were criticised by Judith Stacey and Timothy Biblarz.

Selected works 
 Introduction to Sociology (1983) 
 Sociology of the Family (1986) 
 The Sociology of Public Issues (1989) 
 Introduction to Sociology (1991) 
 Marriage in Men's Lives (1998) 
 Covenant Marriage : The Movement to Reclaim Tradition in America (2008)

References 

American sociologists
2008 deaths
Members of the United States National Academy of Sciences
1950 births
University of Richmond alumni
University of Massachusetts Amherst College of Social and Behavioral Sciences alumni
University of Virginia faculty
Tulane University faculty